THV Galatea is a lighthouse tender operated by Trinity House, the body responsible for the operation of lighthouses and marine navigation aids around the coasts of England, Wales and the Channel Islands.

History
THV Galatea was launched in July 2006, replacing the THV Mermaid, in service with Trinity House since 1987. Mermaid was sold to the Gardline group of Great Yarmouth, for conversion to survey vessel. Galatea is a sister vessel to the NLV Pharos. The Queen and Prince Philip visited the Pool of London on 17 October 2007 for the naming of Galatea, moored alongside .

This is the second Trinity House vessel named Galatea. The first, a paddle yacht built in 1868, served Trinity House until 1895. Galatea attended the commissioning of Eddystone, Wolf and other lighthouses designed by Sir James Douglass. Galatea featured in the 2008 BBC Documentary Comedy, Three Men in a Boat, where Dara Ó Briain, Rory McGrath and Griff Rhys Jones used the vessel to get to the Scilly isles.

In Greek mythology, Galatea was a sea nymph who attended Poseidon (the god of the sea). She loved Acis, the shepherd son of Pan. However, Acis was killed by the jealous Cyclops Polyphemus and, with her heart broken, Galatea turned into a stream of water.

Service
THV Galatea provides aids to navigation for the safe passage of mariners, including maintenance work, buoy deployment, wreck location marking and towing. She is also able to carry out additional tasks such as hydrographic surveying and wreck finding and contract commercial work. She is equipped for:
hydrographic surveys including bathymetry, side scan, sonar and wreck investigations
aids to navigation deployment, maintenance, repair and examination
research platforms for deployment and recovery of scientific equipment
sampling projects
marine hazard search and marking
lifting, towing and accurate positioning of marine equipment
recovery and re-establishment of off-station aids to navigation
sea trials of electronic and speciality equipment
helicopter support
safety boat assignments
guard duties for cable and pipe laying projects

References

External links
 Copyright image at Flickr

2006 ships
Lighthouse tenders of the United Kingdom
Ships built in Gdańsk